Raúl Oscar Lacabanne (July 25, 1914 – March 7, 1985) was Federal Interventor of Córdoba, Argentina from September 7, 1974 to September 19, 1975.

References

1914 births
1985 deaths
Governors of Córdoba Province, Argentina